Carex winterbottomii is a tussock-forming species of perennial sedge in the family Cyperaceae. It is native to the western Himalaya and  parts of Nepal.

See also
List of Carex species

References

winterbottomii
Plants described in 1894
Taxa named by Charles Baron Clarke
Flora of Nepal